Sheremeta (Ukrainian: Шеремета) is a unisex Ukrainian surname that may refer to the following notable people:
Liubov Sheremeta (born 1980), Ukrainian artistic gymnast
Pavlo Sheremeta, Ukrainian economist 
Tymofiy Sheremeta (born 1995), Ukrainian football goalkeeper

See also
 

Ukrainian-language surnames